Mark Lambert may refer to:

Mark Lambert (American actor) (born 1952), American musical theatre actor and singer
Mark Lambert (Irish actor), Irish stage, film and television actor
Mark Lambert (rugby union) (born 1985), English rugby union player
Mark T. Lambert, American businessman and politician from New York
Mark Lambert (engraver) (1781–1855), Tyneside engraver and lithographer (see Thomas Harrison Hair)